German submarine U-403 was a Type VIIC U-boat of Nazi Germany's Kriegsmarine during World War II.

In eight war patrols, she sank two ships totalling . She was sunk by a French aircraft west of Dakar on 18 August 1943 with the loss of all hands.

Design
German Type VIIC submarines were preceded by the shorter Type VIIB submarines. U-403 had a displacement of  when at the surface and  while submerged. She had two shafts and two  propellers.

U-403 was fitted with five  torpedo tubes (four fitted at the bow and one at the stern), fourteen torpedoes, one  SK C/35 naval gun, 220 rounds, and a  C/30 anti-aircraft gun. The boat had a complement of between forty-four and sixty.

Service history
The submarine was laid down on 20 May 1940 at the Danziger Werft at Danzig (now Gdansk, Poland) as yard number 15, launched on 26 February 1941 and commissioned on 25 June under the command of Kapitänleutnant Heinz-Ehlert Clausen.

She served with the 5th U-boat Flotilla from 25 June 1941 for training and the 7th flotilla from 1 September for operations. She was reassigned to the 11th flotilla on 1 July 1942, then the 9th flotilla on 1 March 1943.

First patrol
U-359s first patrol was preceded by a move from Kiel to the German-administered island of Helgoland, (sometimes written as 'Heligoland'), on 26 February 1942. She left there on 1 March, sailing through the Norwegian Sea. She sailed as far as the Barents Sea before docking in Narvik on the 19th.

Second patrol
She moved to Harstad (northwest of Narvik), on 21 April 1942, before setting out on her second foray when she sank the Empire Howard southeast of Bear Island on the 16th. The ship went down in fifty-seven seconds.

Third and fourth patrols
Having berthed in Skjomenfjord (south of Narvik) on 27 July 1942, the boat departed on her fourth sortie on 2 April. Her route took her through the Norwegian, Greenland and Barents Seas. She returned to Skjomenfjord on 20 August.

Fifth and sixth patrols
The submarine's fifth patrol terminated in Narvik on 21 September 1942. She moved to Trondheim on the 26th.

Patrol number six started from Trondheim on 9 January 1943. The boat passed through the gap between Iceland and the Faroe Islands and headed for southeast Greenland. She then turned south and was attacked by a Canso (the Canadian version of the Catalina flying boat) off the Newfoundland coast on 6 February. Moderate damage was sustained. She subsequently sank the Greek-registered Zeus on the 19th.

Seventh and eighth patrols and loss

U-403 escaped, U-43 was not so lucky; she was sunk.

The boat was sunk by depth charges dropped by a Vickers Wellington of No. 344 Squadron RAF, (with a French crew), on 18 August 1943 near Dakar on the west African coast.

Forty-nine men died in U-403; there were no survivors.

Previously recorded fate
U-403 was originally noted as sunk, also on 18 August 1943, by a British Lockheed Hudson of 200 Squadron near Dakar.

Wolfpacks
U-403 took part in twelve wolfpacks, namely:
 Aufnahme (7 – 11 March 1942) 
 Blücher (11 – 18 March 1942) 
 Bums (6 – 14 April 1942) 
 Blutrausch (15 – 18 April 1942) 
 Nebelkönig (7 – 14 August 1942) 
 Trägertod (12 – 19 September 1942) 
 Falke (15 – 19 January 1943) 
 Haudegen (19 January – 15 February 1943) 
 Taifun (15 – 20 February 1943) 
 Amsel (26 April – 3 May 1943) 
 Amsel 4 (3 – 6 May 1943) 
 Rhein (7 – 10 May 1943)

Summary of raiding history

References

Bibliography

External links

German Type VIIC submarines
U-boats commissioned in 1941
U-boats sunk in 1943
U-boats sunk by French aircraft
U-boats sunk by depth charges
1941 ships
Ships built in Danzig
Ships lost with all hands
World War II submarines of Germany
World War II shipwrecks in the Atlantic Ocean
Maritime incidents in August 1943